Beaufort-en-Argonne (literally Beaufort in Argonne) is a commune in the Meuse department in the Grand Est region in northeastern France.

Population
According to 2019 census, it had a population of 145 with a density of 13/km sq.

History
Beaufort was the site of the final shot of World War I: a 95-pound shell fired at 10:59:59 AM on 11 November 1918 from a 155mm howitzer nicknamed Calamity Jane, belonging to Battery E of the U.S. 11th Field Artillery, which was entrenched east of the town. The target is uncertain, but was probably the railway between Metz and Sedan.

Government
The communities representative for the National Assembly of France is Jean-Louis Dumont.

See also
 Communes of the Meuse department

References

Communes of Meuse (department)